Dinkelscherben is a municipality in the district of Augsburg in Bavaria in Germany.
Fleinhausen, Anried, Breitenbronn, Ettelried, Grünenbaindt, Häder, Lindach, Oberschöneberg and Ried are villages that make up the municipality of Dinkelscherben.

Transport 
Dinkelscherben is served by the Ulm-Augsburg railway.

References

Augsburg (district)